Benton Township is one of the eighteen townships of Monroe County, Ohio, United States.  As of the 2010 census, the population was 338.

Geography
Located in the southern part of the county, it borders the following townships:
Perry Township - north
Jackson Township - east
Grandview Township, Washington County - south
Ludlow Township, Washington County - southwest corner
Washington Township - west

No municipalities are located in Benton Township.

Name and history
Statewide, other Benton Townships are located in Hocking, Ottawa, Paulding, and Pike counties.

Government
The township is governed by a three-member board of trustees, who are elected in November of odd-numbered years to a four-year term beginning on the following January 1. Two are elected in the year after the presidential election and one is elected in the year before it. There is also an elected township fiscal officer, who serves a four-year term beginning on April 1 of the year after the election, which is held in November of the year before the presidential election. Vacancies in the fiscal officership or on the board of trustees are filled by the remaining trustees.

References

External links
County website

Townships in Monroe County, Ohio
Townships in Ohio